Diasporus hylaeformis, also known as the Pico Blanco robber frog or the montane dink frog, is a species of frog in the family Eleutherodactylidae. It is found in humid mountain areas in Costa Rica and Panama. Its natural habitats are dense montane forest and tropical rainforest. It is an abundant, nocturnal species found in low vegetation.

At  snout–vent length, female Diasporus hylaeformis are the largest frogs in the genus Diasporus.

References

hylaeformis
Amphibians of Costa Rica
Amphibians of Panama
Amphibians described in 1875
Taxa named by Edward Drinker Cope
Taxonomy articles created by Polbot